A rump state is the remnant of a once much larger state, left with a reduced territory in the wake of secession, annexation, occupation, decolonization, or a successful coup d'état or revolution on part of its former territory. In the last case, a government stops short of going into exile because it controls part of its former territory.

Examples

Ancient history
During the Second Intermediate Period, following the conquest of Lower Egypt by the Hyksos, there was a rump Egyptian kingdom in Upper Egypt centered on Thebes, which eventually reunified the country at the start of the New Kingdom.
 Seleucid Empire after losing most of its territory to the Parthian Empire.
 The State of Shu Han during the Chinese Three Kingdoms Period, claimed to be a continuation of the original Han Dynasty.
 After the collapse of the Western Roman Empire in Gaul, the Kingdom of Soissons survived as a rump state under Aegidius and Syagrius until conquered by the Franks under Clovis I in 486.

Post-classical history
 Sultanate of Rum, a rump state to Seljuk Empire.
 After the Almoravid conquest of the Taifa of Zaragoza in 1110, the taifa's last ruler, Abd-al-Malik, maintained a tiny rump emirate at Rueda de Jalón until his death in 1130.
 After the Jin dynasty assumed control over northern China in 1127, the Southern Song existed as a rump state of the Northern Song dynasty, although it still retained over half of Northern Song's territory and more than half of its population.
 By summer 1503, the Aq Qoyunlu rule collapsed in Iran. Some Aq Qoyunlu rump states continued to rule until 1508, before they were absorbed into the Safavid Empire by Ismail I.
 After the Ming dynasty established control over China proper, the Yuan dynasty retreated to the Mongolian Plateau and survived as a rump state called the Northern Yuan.
After the Spanish conquest of the Inca Empire in 1532, the Neo-Inca State based at Vilcabamba survived as a rump state until 1572.

Modern history
 The Polish–Lithuanian Commonwealth was left as a rump state after the First Partition of Poland by Russia, Prussia, and Austria in 1772. The resulting rump state was partitioned again in 1793 and annexed outright in 1795. After Napoleon's victory in the War of the Fourth Coalition in 1807, he created a new Polish rump state, the Duchy of Warsaw. After Napoleon's defeat, the Congress of Vienna created a state, Congress Poland in 1815.
 The Republic of German-Austria was created in 1918 as the initial rump state for areas with a predominantly German-speaking population within what had been the Austro-Hungarian Empire.
 The Ottoman Empire became a rump state at the end of the First World War when Britain and France divided the majority of its territory into League of Nations mandate states.
 The fascist Italian Social Republic, a German puppet state led by Benito Mussolini, was a rump state of the Kingdom of Italy between 1943–1945.
 The Republic of China towards the end of the Chinese Civil War retreated to the island of Taiwan. Although the original territory was reduced to Kinmen and Matsu Islands, the ROC had obtained control of the island of Taiwan and Penghu from the Empire of Japan in 1945, a controversial status that remains legally debated to this day.
Serbia and Montenegro (officially the Federal Republic of Yugoslavia from 1992 to 2003 and the State Union of Serbia and Montenegro  from 2003 to 2006) was often viewed as the rump state left behind by the Socialist Federal Republic of Yugoslavia (1945–1992) after it broke up. 
 The Islamic Republic of Afghanistan: After the Fall of Kabul in 2021, the Taliban forces defeated the Afghan military and forced it to relocate to the Panjshir Valley (beginning the Republican insurgency in Afghanistan). Despite controlling less than 1% of the territory of Afghanistan, it continues to remain the internationally recognized Government of Afghanistan.

See also
Government in exile
List of historical unrecognized states and dependencies
Puppet state
Successor state
Secession

References

Citations

Sources 

 

Political metaphors
Types of countries
Rump states
Former countries